Two submarines of the United States Navy have borne the name Amberjack, for a pair of species of vigorous sport fish.

 , was a Gato-class submarine that was lost after a successful career during World War II.
 , was a Tench-class submarine that served through most of the Cold War and was later sold to Brazil.

Sources

United States Navy ship names